Dendy bin Lowa (born 13 May 1992) is a Malaysian professional footballer who plays as a defender for Malaysia Super League club Sabah.

Honour
Sabah 
Malaysia Premier League: 2019

References

External links
 

1992 births
Living people
Malaysian footballers
People from Sabah
Sabah F.C. (Malaysia) players
Association football defenders